The enzyme CMP-N-acylneuraminate phosphodiesterase (EC 3.1.4.40) catalyzes the reaction

CMP-N-acylneuraminate + H2O  CMP + N-acylneuraminate

This enzyme belongs to the family of hydrolases, specifically those acting on phosphoric diester bonds.  The systematic name of this enzyme class is CMP-N-acylneuraminate N-acylneuraminohydrolase. Other names in common use include CMP-sialate hydrolase, CMP-sialic acid hydrolase, CMP-N-acylneuraminic acid hydrolase, cytidine monophosphosialic hydrolase, cytidine monophosphosialate hydrolase, cytidine monophosphate-N-acetylneuraminic acid hydrolase, and CMP-N-acetylneuraminate hydrolase.

References

 

EC 3.1.4
Enzymes of unknown structure